These Days is the eighth studio album by American country music singer Crystal Gayle. Released in August 1980, it peaked at No. 6 on the Billboard Country Album chart.

Continuing Gayle's run of No. 1 Billboard Country singles, the album contained the No. 1 hits "If You Ever Change Your Mind" and "Too Many Lovers". Another track, "Take It Easy" also became a Country hit, peaking at No. 17.

The album was certified gold by the RIAA in 1994 for sales of over 500,000 copies.

Track listing

Personnel
Crystal Gayle - lead and harmony vocals
Jon Goin, Chris Leuzinger, Billy Sanford - guitar
Tommy Cogbill, Richard "Spady" Brannan, Joe Allen - bass
Bobby Wood - acoustic piano, organ
Charles Cochran - electric and acoustic piano, string arrangements
Larrie Londin, Gene Chrisman, Kenny Malone - drums
Farrell Morris - tambourine
Jay Patten - saxophone
Denis Solee - saxophone, flute, clarinet
The Sheldon Kurland Strings (Carl Gorodetzky, Dennis Molchan, George Binkley, Lennie Haight, Marvin Chantry, Roy Christensen, Samuel Terranova, Sheldon Kurland, Stephanie Woolf, Virginia Christensen) - strings
Bruce Dees, David Loggins, Jennifer Kimball, Marcia Routh, Pebble Daniel, Steve Brantley - harmony vocals on "Take It Easy"
Technical
Garth Fundis, John Donegan - engineer
Virginia Team - art direction
Beverly Parker, Brian Hagiwara - photography

Charts

Weekly charts

Year-end charts

References

Crystal Gayle albums
1980 albums
Albums produced by Allen Reynolds
Columbia Records albums